The Christian Speech & Debate League, also known as the National Christian Forensics and Communications Association, is a speech and debate league for Christian students in the United States. The NCFCA was established in 2001 after outgrowing its parent organization, the Home School Legal Defense Association (HSLDA), which had been running the league since it was originally established in 1995. NCFCA is now organized under its own board of directors with regional and state leadership coordinating various tournaments throughout the season.

Since 2001, the NCFCA seeks to provide students with the opportunity to apply and communicate their worldview with skill and clarity through competitive debate. The mission of the organization is to "challenge and equip ambassadors for Christ to communicate truth with integrity and grace." As a Christian organization, NCFCA's statement of faith is the Nicene Creed. NCFCA claims that "...their training and competition will provide a supportive opportunity for them to apply a biblical worldview to real-life issues."

Structure of the organization
The NCFCA is a volunteer-run, non-profit organization. Tournaments are run by volunteers, who are usually parents, club directors, and league officials in the area. The judging pool includes parents of competitors, NCFCA alumni, and members of the community. Coaches also serve as judges on a volunteer basis. The NCFCA is governed by a board and divided into eleven regions. Each region has a regional coordinator and each state has a representative.

National Opens
Additionally, a certain number of national invitational slots are awarded each year at competitions known as National Opens. Currently, each national open awards two nationals slots for every individual speech event and debate event and four slots for moot court. These are large tournaments held mostly at colleges  or large convention centers and are open to the entire nation. Qualifying at a National Open tends to be more difficult than a regional qualifying tournament because of their increased size.

National opens since 2005:
2005: California National Open (San Diego, CA); Colorado National Open (Colorado Springs, CO)
2006: California National Open (San Diego, CA); Tennessee National Open (Jefferson City, TN); Colorado National Open (Colorado Springs, CO)
2007: Washington National Open (Seattle, WA); Ohio National Open (Cedarville, OH); Texas National Open (Houston, TX)
2008: Virginia National Open (Virginia Beach, VA); Colorado National Open (Colorado Springs, CO); Texas National Open (Houston, TX)
2009: Texas National Open (Houston, TX); Alabama National Open (Trussville, AL)
2010: Texas National Open (Houston, TX); Massachusetts National Open (Wenham, MA); Colorado National Open (Denver, CO)
2011: Texas National Open (Houston, TX); Georgia National Open (Lookout Mountain, GA)
2012: Texas National Open (Houston, TX); Illinois Open (Joliet, IL); Washington Open (Spokane, WA)
2013: Alabama National Open (Montgomery, AL); Massachusetts National Open (Wenham, MA)
2014: Idaho National Open (Nampa, ID); Minnesota National Open (St. Paul, MN); North Carolina National Open (Black Mountain, NC)
2015: North Carolina National Open (Black Mountain, NC); Massachusetts National Open (Wenham, MA); Idaho National Open (Nampa, ID)
2016: California National Open (San Diego, CA); North Carolina National Open (Black Mountain, NC); Oklahoma National Open (Shawnee, OK);  Wisconsin National Open (Oshkosh, WI)
2017: Washington National Open (Spokane, WA); Massachusetts National Open (Wenham, MA); and North Carolina National Open (Black Mountain, NC).
2018: Wisconsin National Open (Oshkosh, WI) and North Carolina National Open (Black Mountain, NC).
2019: North Carolina National Open (Black Mountain, NC).
2020: North Carolina National Open (Black Mountain, NC) and Kentucky National Open (Louisville, KY).
2022: North Carolina National Open (Black Mountain, NC).
2023: North Carolina National Open (Black Mountain, NC).

National Mixers
National Mixers debuted in the 2017–2018 season and have been recalled for the 2022–2023 season. Mixers are competitions, now mostly online, incorporating competitors from two or more regions. They were officially known as March Mixer, because they only occurred in the month of March. As national level tournaments, they hosted moot court, but they only gave out one national championship slot in each individual event and debate event and two slots in moot court. In the first year, there were eight March Mixers, all occurring in the first two weeks of March. There was a mixer in a city inside every region except 1 and 3 (which are much smaller than the other eight regions). Because of the large number of mixers and their close proximity in time, most competitors went to only the mixer closest to their home in the first year even though they could technically attend any mixer in the country.

As of the 2022–2023 NCFCA season, there were two online Moot Court national mixers and one online national mixer. Mixers between two or more individual regions happened throughout the season, from January into March.

Competition
During the 2005–2006 season, there were roughly 5,000 competitors, making the NCFCA the third largest national high school speech and debate league after the National Speech and Debate Association and the National Catholic Forensic League.

Speech
The NCFCA offers ten individual events for speech from three categories: Platform (memorized, 10-minute speeches), Interpretation (short interpretations of written works), and Limited Preparation (impromptu or limited preparation speeches) . The rules for each of these events are published in the Speech Guide each season. 

Competitors may only compete in five out of the ten events at a given tournament.

At qualifier tournaments, competitors compete in three rounds of speech and are judged by three judges.

As of the 2022-2023 NCFCA season, these events are:

 Platform: Persuasive, Informative, Digital Presentation, After Dinner (humourous)
 Interpretation: Duo Interpretation, Open Interpretation, Biblical Presentation
 Limited Preparation: Apologetics, Extemperaneous, Impromptu

From 2002 to 2007 and 2013–2014, the NCFCA also provided a different Wildcard event each season:
The 2002–2003 Wildcard was Duo Impromptu. Two competitors would randomly draw three pieces of paper with the words for a person, place, and thing. Then they would have four minutes to prepare a five-minute skit incorporating all three nouns.
The 2003–2004 Wildcard was Impromptu Apologetics. It was later renamed Apologetics and has become a standard NCFCA event.
The 2004–2005 Wildcard was Oratorical Interpretation. The competitor would interpret a famous and/or historical speech.
The 2006–2007 Wildcard was Thematic Interpretation. Competitors select several pieces of literature and weave them around a common theme. Thematic interpretation became a standard event for the 2009–2010 and 2010–2011 seasons but was retired in July 2011, and became a standard event again for the 2013–2014 season.
From 2007 to 2012, there were no new Wildcard events.
The 2013–2014 Wildcard was After-Dinner Speaking, a sort of humorous, persuasive or informative speech.
The 2018–2019 wildcard event was Biblical Thematic. Competitors select several pieces of literature, including one biblical selection exceeding 300 words, and weave them around a common theme. Biblical interpretation became a standard event for the 2019–2020 and 2020–2021 season.
The 2019–2020 and 2020–2021 wildcard event was Humorous Interpretation. Similar to Open Interpretation in both speech structure in execution, Humorous Interp. requires competitors to interpret a published literary selection with elements of humor, and allows for a self-authored introduction or conclusion.

Debate
The NCFCA offers three types of debate: Team Policy Debate, Lincoln-Douglas Value Debate, and Moot court. The NCFCA discourages the use of overly complicated theory and extremely fast talking (also known as "spreading").

At tournaments, competitors speak in six rounds and are judged by one judge in prelimary rounds. In elimination rounds, competitors are judged by three judges and are judged by five judges in the qualifier tournament final.

 Team Policy (TP): A policy-centered debate, with rounds typically lasting 90 minutes. Two teams of two competitors form the 'Affirmative' and 'Negative' sides to the debate, with the Affirmative arguing for a reform to the system and the Negative arguing against it. The debate is set by a resolution that is published before a season starts. The resolution for the 2022 - 2023 season states that "the United States Federal Government shall significantly reform its import and/or export policies within the bounds of international trade" . The resolution is voted on by competitors and alternates between domestic and international policy
 Lincoln-Douglas (LD): A value-centered debate, with rounds lasting around 45 minutes. Two competitors form the 'Affirmative' and 'Negative' sides to the debate, with the Affirmative affirming the validity of the resolution and the Negative negating it. As in Team Policy, the debate is governed by a resolution affirming one value above another. The resolution for the 2022 - 2023 season states that "the individual right to property should be valued above the economic interests of the community" .

National Championship locations
1998: Home School Legal Defense Association – Purcellville, Virginia
1999: Home School Legal Defense Association – Purcellville, Virginia
2000: Point Loma Nazarene University – San Diego, California
2001: Santa Clara University – Santa Clara, California
2002: Blackman High School – Murfreesboro, Tennessee
2003: Cedarville University – Cedarville, Ohio
2004: Liberty University – Lynchburg, Virginia
2005: Point Loma Nazarene University – San Diego, California
2006: Patrick Henry College – Purcellville, Virginia
2007: University of Mary Hardin-Baylor – Belton, Texas
2008: Berry Middle School – Birmingham, Alabama
2009: Bob Jones University – Greenville, South Carolina
2010: Regent University – Virginia Beach, Virginia
2011: Gordon College – Wenham, Massachusetts
2012: Northwestern College – St. Paul, Minnesota
2013: Oral Roberts University – Tulsa, Oklahoma
2014: Patrick Henry College – Purcellville, Virginia
2015: Northwestern College – St. Paul, Minnesota
2016: Oklahoma Baptist University – Shawnee, OK
2017: Northwestern College – St. Paul, Minnesota
2018: Northwestern College – St. Paul, Minnesota
2019: Anderson University - Anderson, South Carolina
2020: Northwestern College – St. Paul, Minnesota (the 2020 national championship was canceled due to COVID-19 concerns)
2021: Online (the 2021 national championship was held virtually due to COVID-19 concerns)
2022: Northwestern College – St. Paul, Minnesota

See also
Competitive debate in the United States
National Forensic League
National Catholic Forensic League
Stoa USA

References

http://iew.com/

External links
Official NCFCA website
Official NCFCA Hall of Fame

Student debating societies
Homeschooling in the United States
Youth organizations based in Washington (state)